Chaetoplagia is a genus of bristle flies in the family Tachinidae. There is at least one described species in Chaetoplagia, C. atripennis.

Distribution
Nicaragua, Puerto Rico, Trinidad and Tobago.

References

Diptera of North America
Dexiinae
Monotypic Brachycera genera
Tachinidae genera
Taxa named by Daniel William Coquillett